Corymbia dendromerinx, commonly known as ghost gum, is a species of tree that is endemic to the south-western Kimberley region of Western Australia. It has smooth bark, sometimes with a stocking of rough bark near the base, a crown of variably-shaped leaves, flower buds mostly in groups of seven, creamy white flowers and barrel-shaped, cylindrical or cup-shaped fruit.

Description
It has smooth white to cream-coloured bark that is shed in small sheets, sometimes with a stocking of rough, scaly bark near the base, the rough bark not clearly demarcated from the smooth bark, as in similar ghost gums. Flowering has been observed from October to December and the flowers are creamy white.

Taxonomy and naming
Corymbia dendromerinx was first formally described in 1995 by Kenneth Hill and Lawrence Alexander Sidney Johnson in the journal Telopea. The specific epithet (dendromerinx) is derived from the Greek, meaning "a tree" and "a bristle", referring to the tree-like appearance of the bristles on the leaves when magnified.

Distribution and habitat
This ghost gum grows mostly on plains and flat sites in the south-west Kimberley region, and prefers alluvial soils or red loams. It is abundant to the west of Fitzroy Crossing and south of the Wunaamin Miliwundi Ranges.

See also
 List of Corymbia species

References

dendromerinx
Myrtales of Australia
Rosids of Western Australia
Plants described in 1995